McLeod Hill is a rounded, ice-covered hill of elevation 1,790 m in the south part of Hemimont Plateau in Graham Land, Antarctica, which forms a prominent landmark 1 mi east of the head of Northeast Glacier. It was first roughly surveyed in 1936 by the British Graham Land Expedition (BGLE), and resurveyed by the U.S. Antarctic Service (USAS), 1939–41. It was resurveyed in 1946 by the Falklands Islands Dependencies Survey (FIDS) and named for Kenneth A. McLeod, Falklands Islands Dependencies Survey (FIDS) meteorological observer who, during July-December 1947, occupied with a member of the Ronne Antarctic Research Expedition (RARE) the plateau meteorological station 1 mi east of this hill.

References 

Hills of Graham Land
Fallières Coast